Liolaemus scapularis, the shoulder tree iguana, is a species of lizard in the family Iguanidae.  It is from Argentina.

References

scapularis
Lizards of South America
Reptiles of Argentina
Endemic fauna of Argentina
Reptiles described in 1982
Taxa named by Raymond Laurent